T. R. Abhilashi Memorial Institute Of Engineering And Technology (TRAMIET)  is a private engineering institution established in the year 2009, situated in the Mandi District of Himachal Pradesh & affiliated to Himachal Pradesh Technical University & Himachal Pradesh University.

History
The college was started in 2009 and it took its first batch of students in 3 disciplines then affiliated to the Himachal Pradesh University, Shimla. Later it came under Himachal Pradesh Technical University after the latter was formed. It is AICTE Approved.

Campus
Institute is located 200 km from Chandigarh via National Highway 21 (India), 140 km from Shimla towards Manali. It is a residential campus.

Facilities
 The college has  of campus housing the academic departments as well as providing residential facilities to students and faculty. The campus has class rooms, laboratories, drawing hall, workshops, library, conference hall, and student support facilities like hostels, canteen, stationery shop, medical support, transport. It has a playground where all the sporting events take place.

Organisation and administration
The college is managed by Abhilashi Educational Society.

Academics

Academic programmes 
The college imparts NAAC accredited undergraduate courses in six streams of engineering:
 Civil Engineering (Separate Block)
 Mechanical Engineering (Separate Block Under Construction)
 Electrical Engineering (Separate Block Under Construction)
 Computer Science & Engineering
 Electronics & Communication Engineering

Admissions
Students are admitted through counselling based on  Joint Entrance Examination ranks, Himachal Pradesh Common Entrance Test (HPCET) and Management Quotas.

Student life
College marks presence of students from different states of India. Most of them belong to the state of Himachal Pradesh. There is a student-led organization named UV Club (Unique Vision Club) in the college which is an extra curricular activities organizing club. HillFest is an annual two Day Technical Festival being organized by student's body of the Institute since 2011.

See also
 Engineering
 INDIA
 New Delhi
 Himachal Pradesh
 List of institutions of higher education in Himachal Pradesh
 Himachal Pradesh University
 AICTE
 Coalition to Uproot Ragging from Education

References

External links
 Official website
 
 HPTU website

Private engineering colleges in India
Engineering colleges in Himachal Pradesh
Education in Mandi district
Educational institutions established in 2009
2009 establishments in Himachal Pradesh